Marella Mamoun (born 16 May 1982) is a Syrian former swimmer, who specialized in middle-distance freestyle events. Mamoun competed only in the women's 200 m freestyle at the 2000 Summer Olympics in Sydney. She received a ticket from FINA, under a Universality program, in an entry time of 2:16.17. She participated in heat one against two other swimmers Nisha Millet of India and Pamela Vásquez of Honduras. She rounded out a small field of swimmers to last place in a time of 2:18.78, trailing behind leader Millet by almost ten seconds. Mamoun failed to advance into the semifinals, as she placed thirty-ninth overall in the prelims.

References

1982 births
Living people
Syrian female swimmers
Olympic swimmers of Syria
Swimmers at the 2000 Summer Olympics
Syrian female freestyle swimmers
Sportspeople from Damascus
Swimmers at the 1998 Asian Games
Asian Games competitors for Syria